The Üßbach (also Ueßbach or Üssbach) is a stream, just under  long in the Eifel in the German state of Rhineland-Palatinate. It rises near Mosbruch in the county of Vulkaneifel and empties near Alf (Cochem-Zell) into the eponymous river, just before the Alf discharges into the river Moselle. The spa resort of Bad Bertrich lies on the Üßbach.

See also 
List of rivers of Rhineland-Palatinate

Footnotes

References 

Rivers of the Eifel
Rivers of Rhineland-Palatinate
Vulkaneifel
Cochem-Zell
Rivers of Germany